The Backyardigans is a computer-animated musical children's television series created by Janice Burgess. The series was written and recorded at Nickelodeon Animation Studio. It centers on five animal neighbors who imagine themselves on fantastic adventures in their backyard. Each episode is set to a different musical genre and features four songs, composed by Evan Lurie with lyrics by McPaul Smith. The Backyardigans' adventures span many different genres and settings. The show's writers took inspiration from action-adventure movies, and many episodes are parodies of movies.

Nickelodeon called the show "a home-grown Nick Jr. property," as "the whole creative team... [had] been part of the Nick Jr. family for years." Creator Janice Burgess had worked as Nick Jr.'s production executive since the mid-1990s. The Backyardigans originated as a live-action pilot episode titled "Me and My Friends," filmed at Nickelodeon Studios Florida in 1998. The characters were played by full-body puppets on an indoor stage. The pilot was rejected by Nickelodeon, and Burgess decided to rework the concept into an animated series. In 2002, a second pilot was animated at Nickelodeon Digital in New York. The second pilot was successful, and the series entered production.

The show ran for four seasons totaling 80 episodes. Most episodes aired on Nickelodeon on weekday mornings. In 2009, the show was planned to continue beyond the fourth season. However, in 2010, the series' creator Janice Burgess decided to move onto a different series: Nickelodeon's revival of Winx Club. Burgess worked as a creative director and writer for Winx Club before eventually retiring from Nickelodeon in 2014.

The Backyardigans was critically acclaimed. Many critics felt that The Backyardigans was superior to Nickelodeon's other preschool shows because its writing was sophisticated and enjoyable for older viewers. The New York Times and Common Sense Media commended the show for including frequent nods to an older audience, such as references to action-adventure franchises. The quality of the show's music was also praised by critics, and the show received eight Daytime Emmy Award nominations for its music.

Plot
The show centers around a group of five animal neighbors: Uniqua, Pablo, Tyrone, Tasha, and Austin. They share a large backyard between their houses. In each episode, they meet in the backyard and imagine themselves on a fantastical adventure. Their adventures span a variety of different genres and settings; many episodes involve visiting different parts of the world, traveling back or forward in time, and using magic or supernatural powers. The characters give themselves different jobs or roles depending on the episode's imaginary setting, such as detectives, knights, or scientists. From the second season onward, many episodes are parodies of action-adventure films such as James Bond, Star Trek, Indiana Jones, and Ghostbusters.

The openings and endings of the episodes follow a similar pattern. The stories begin with the characters in the backyard, introducing themselves and explaining the scenario they are about to imagine. When the Backyardigans finish their adventure, the fantasy sequence fades, restoring the original backyard setting. The characters sing a closing song, then walk inside their houses for a snack and close the door. As the episode ends, at least one character reopens the door and shouts a phrase related to the adventure.

The show follows the format of a stage musical. Each episode is set to a different genre of music and features four songs. The characters sing and dance to the songs with original choreography. The song and dance routines are often used to introduce a character's imaginary role, further the plot, or explain a problem. In addition to singing songs in a new genre each episode, the show's background music changes to match, scoring all of the Backyardigans' actions.

Characters

Each of the five characters on the show has two voice actors: one for speaking, and the other for singing. Live-action dancers first performed the dancing on the show, and their movements were later transported to animation. The choreographer, Beth Bogush, described the process: "What we do is we film the live footage in the studio, send that off, and they do a Leica, and then they send it to the animators. The animators watch and were pretty precise. What we film for that day is pretty close to what you see in the character."

Main

 Uniqua (speaking voice by LaShawn Tinah Jefferies, singing voices provided by Jamia Simone Nash in Seasons 1-3 and Avion Baker in Season 4) is a pink-spotted creature who is curious, self-confident, and adventurous. She likes to tell jokes and make her friends laugh. The series uses the name "Uniqua" for both the character and her species. She wears pink, polka-dotted overalls and has a pair of swirled antennae on top of her head. She usually imagines herself having roles that require brains and courage, such as a scientist or pirate captain. Creator Janice Burgess describes Uniqua as the child she wishes she was like as a child. She is the only main character to appear in every episode.
 Pablo (speaking voices by Zach Tyler Eisen in Season 1, Jake Goldberg in Seasons 2-4 and singing voice provided by Sean Curley) is a blue penguin with a yellow beak who is high-strung, frenetic, and tends to overreact. He wears a blue bow tie and a propeller beanie. Due to his energy and impetuousness, he often goes into a "panic attack" when he faces an obstacle, running around in circles and telling everyone not to worry until someone gets his attention by calling his name three times. Pablo's panic attacks became less prominent after Season 1, though in the later episode "The Flipper!", his propensity for getting overexcited is the main plot point. Pablo does not appear one time: "Chichen-Itza Pizza." 
 Tyrone (speaking voices by Reginald Davis Jr. in Seasons 1-2, Jordan Coleman in Seasons 2-3, Christopher Grant, Jr. in Season 4 and singing voices provided by Corwin C. Tuggles in Season 1, Leon Thomas III in Seasons 2-3, Damani Roberts in Season 3 and Tyrel Jackson Williams in Seasons 3-4) is a red-haired orange moose who is laid-back and cool-headed. He wears a red and blue striped shirt. He is best friends with Pablo, and he is almost the complete opposite of Pablo in terms of personality, with his calm and easy going character. Tyrone is known for his sarcastic comments, one of them being "That certainly was convenient." At the end of most episodes, he says, "That was an excellent (type) adventure, don't you think?" Despite not appearing to wear trousers, Tyrone somehow manages to put his hands in his pockets.
 Tasha (speaking voices by Naelee Rae in Seasons 1-2, Gianna Bruzzese in Seasons 3-4 and singing voices provided by Kristin Klabunde in Seasons 1-3 and Gabriella Malek in Seasons 3-4) is a strong-willed yellow hippopotamus who is rational, skeptical, and highly motivated to get her own way. Tasha wears red Mary-Jane shoes and an orange dress with a flower pattern. She is the most serious of the Backyardigans, though she can be just as easy going as the others from time to time. Her catchphrase is "Oh, for goodness sakes." Nickelodeon describes Tasha as "deceptively sweet" and "tough-as-nails."
 Austin (speaking voice by Jonah Bobo, singing voices provided by Thomas Sharkey in Seasons 1-3 and Nicholas Barasch in Season 4) is a shy but fun-loving purple kangaroo. In Season 1, he is reserved and soft-spoken due to recently moving into the neighborhood. In later episodes, Austin becomes more outgoing and is revealed to be smart and imaginative. Austin rarely appears in the spotlight, but takes the role of the lead character in several episodes. Beth Bogush described him as "the one pulling up the rear. He's kind of a get-along guy."

Recurring
Sherman (vocal effects by Oliver Wyman) is a small, orange-spotted yellow worm. Sherman is easily scared due to his small size. He appears in "The Heart of the Jungle," "Polka Palace Party," and "Attack of the 50 Foot Worman".
The Wormans are a fictional species of colorful, worm-like creatures who speak in squeaks and gibberish. They appear in all the seasons of the show.
Dragon (vocal effects by Oliver Wyman) is a friendly, green-colored dragon who appears three times (the movie "Tale of the Mighty Knights" and the episode "The Tale of the Not-So-Nice Dragon"). He hatched from a spotted egg and lives inside of Dragon Mountain.
The Aliens are green-colored aliens with eyestalks who appear four times: "Mission to Mars," "News Flash," "Los Galacticos," and "The Big Dipper Diner."
The Giant Clam is a hungry, irritable clam who appears in "The Legend of the Volcano Sisters" and "The Great Dolphin Race." It is very protective of its pearl. It pants and acts like a dog.
The Voices were included in the episodes "Secret Mission" and "It's Great to Be a Ghost!" that do not come from any shown character.
Robot Roscoe (vocal effects by Evan Matthew Weinstein) is a robot owned by Austin, who appears three times in the fourth season (the movie "Robot Rampage" and the episode "Elephant on the Run").

Episodes

Production

Janice Burgess drew inspiration from action films when writing episodes of the show, as she wanted to adapt high-stakes stories for a young audience. In an interview with the Pittsburgh Post-Gazette, Burgess was asked what inspired the show; she responded, "I know this is going to sound very strange, but the things I really draw upon are action films. I like Die Hard, Star Wars, the Tolkien movies ... I thought it would be fun to take kids on that big adventure." The character of Uniqua was based on how Burgess viewed herself as a child; as a result, Uniqua was written as the leader of the Backyardigans, and Uniqua was the only character who appeared in every episode.

Before Nickelodeon ordered the first season, two pilot episodes of The Backyardigans were made. The first was a live-action pilot titled "Me and My Friends," filmed at Nickelodeon Studios in September 1998. The characters were played by full-body puppets who danced on an indoor stage. The pilot was rejected by Nickelodeon, and Janice Burgess decided to rework the concept into an animated show. In 2002, a second pilot was created; it was a computer-animated short produced at Nickelodeon Digital. The second pilot was greenlit by Nickelodeon to become a full-length series. Nickelodeon called the show "a home-grown Nick Jr. property," as "the whole creative team... [had] been part of the Nick Jr. family for years."

In December 2009, Nick Jr. president Brown Johnson stated that Nickelodeon intended to keep the show running for "at least another five years. Maybe forever." Nickelodeon believed that The Backyardigans was an ideal "evergreen" property: a series that would stay in production for a long time through multiple generations. A fifth season was planned in 2009. However, in 2010, Janice Burgess decided to end The Backyardigans to start working on one of Nickelodeon Animation Studio's newer projects: a revival series of Winx Club, a girls' action-adventure franchise. Burgess brought the former Backyardigans crew onto Winx Club as well. This included lyricist McPaul Smith; writers Jeff Borkin, Adam Peltzman, and Carin Greenberg; line producer Sara Kamen; and script coordinator Jonathan Foss. Burgess worked as the creative director, story editor, and writer on Winx Club. The crew considered it a natural progression, as Winx Club was also a musical action-adventure show, but it targeted an older audience, allowing them to branch out.

Reception 
The Backyardigans received eight Daytime Emmy Award nominations, and Janice Burgess won the 2008 Emmy for Outstanding Special Class Animated Program. In a 2016 article for The Chicago Tribune, drama critic Chris Jones called The Backyardigans "a fabulously inventive TV show." DVD Talks John Crichton gave the show a "hearty recommendation," citing its "enjoyable (and varied) music score, the character voices (both spoken and singing) and the impressive visual presentation." Slate named the Backyardigans episode "The Swamp Creature" one of the best episodes of children's television.

Critics noted that the series held broad appeal to older viewers, due to its high-quality music and focus on character-driven, non-educational stories. Susan Stewart of The New York Times said "it's hard to say whether The Backyardigans is a fantasy for children or for their parents," commending the show's animation and storytelling. Common Sense Media's Emily Ashby wrote, "It's not always easy to find a show you like as much as your youngsters do, but The Backyardigans definitely has the potential to fit that bill." Journalist Virginia Heffernan wrote, "with each episode devoted not just to a separate quest but also to a different musical genre...the show blows you away with its artistic exactitude."

In 2021, the songs "Castaways" and "Into the Thick of It" went viral on TikTok, with the former appearing in more than 745,000 videos and the latter appearing in more than 46,000 videos as of June 2021. Due to their success on TikTok, "Castaways" and "Into the Thick of It" reached number 5 and 13 respectively on the Spotify viral 50 chart in the US for the week beginning on June 10, 2021.

Related media

Live events

The Backyardigans was adapted into several stage shows. These included 2008's "Tale of the Mighty Knights" and 2010's "Storytime Live!" (an event featuring other Nick Jr. characters from Dora the Explorer, Wonder Pets!, and Ni Hao, Kai-Lan, as well as hosts Moose and Zee). In Canada, separate live shows called "Quest for the Extra Ordinary Aliens" (2008) and "Sea Deep in Adventure" (2009) were created.

Merchandise
Activision released a The Backyardigans PC game, "Mission to Mars," in October 2006. Also, there are interactive Backyardigans games available for the LeapPad and VTech's V.Smile consoles. There is also a LeapFrog ClickStart game titled "Number Pie Samurai," teaching children the necessary computer skills.

From 2005 to 2007, Kohl's had a section devoted to the series' merchandise, including a clothing line and toys exclusively in-store.

Over one hundred storybooks (both original stories and episode-based) were released throughout the series' run. Most of these were released in both Canada and the United States; however, a 2006 series of educational books were exclusively sold in Canada under the license of Treehouse TV.

Fisher-Price produced numerous plush toys and interactive character toys (mostly Uniqua, Pablo, and Tyrone). There are also Beanie Babies of all the main characters available.

Home media
In the United States, the show's 80 episodes were released across a series of 21 DVD releases. Ten episodes of the first season were also released to VHS across five volumes. Viacom's Paramount Home Media Distribution published all of the show's video releases. Outside North America, Paramount released DVDs under a separate deal with Nelvana, with this worldwide deal later transitioning to Fremantle Home Entertainment.

Main releases

Episodes on Nick Jr. compilation DVDs

British releases

iTunes releases
All four seasons have been released on the iTunes Store in Canada and the United States; however, the US iTunes Store is missing three episodes from the first season: "Secret Mission," "It's Great to Be a Ghost!," and "High Tea".

CD releases
There were three The Backyardigans albums released in North America, and one album released in Europe. Each has approximately 20 tracks, while Born to Play has four bonus tracks only available on the iTunes Store.

The Backyardigans
Released on July 12, 2005, under Nick Records' label. This is the first album sold in stores. It contains nineteen tracks from the first season, including the opening theme.
The CD also contains a bonus video track titled "Go, Go, Go!"

 "The Backyardigans Theme Song"
 "You and Me to the Rescue"
 "Castaways"
 "Questing, Questing"
 "A Pirate Says Arr"
 "Yeti Stomp!"
 "Queens Are Never Wrong"
 "Those Bones" (tune: "Dem Bones")
 "Buffalo Girls & Boys" (tune: "Buffalo Gals")
 "Trudge, Trudge, Trudge"
 "Secret Agent"
 "Laser Limbo Tango" (tune: "Limbo Rock")
 "Row Your Boat" (tune: "Row, Row, Row Your Boat")
 "Into the Thick of It"
 "P.U.! (Stinky Swamp Song)"
 "Flying Rock Song (II)" (tune: "Hail, Hail, the Gang's All Here")
 "When I'm Booin'" (tune: "When You're Smiling")
 "Please and Thank You" (tune: "Shine On, Harvest Moon")
 "Rockabilly Lullaby"

Groove to the Music
This second CD was released on July 11, 2006, under Nick Records' label. It contains eighteen tracks from Seasons 1 and 2.

 "Hold on Tight"
 "Gotta Get the Job Done"
 "Shake Your Body"
 "Rad Moves"
 "We're Going to Mars"
 "Drumming Song"
 "Eureka!"
 "The Rules"
 "Tree to Tree"
 "What's So Scary 'Bout That?"
 "The Ballad of the Brave Pink Knight"
 "I Love Being a Princess"
 "Aha!"
 "Skate Ahead"
 "We'll Get You What You Want"
 "Ski Patrol to the Rescue"
 "Super Heroes vs. Super Villains"
 "Oh, My Sherman" (tune: "Oh My Darling, Clementine")

Born to Play
The third and final Backyardigans CD was released on January 22, 2008, under Sony BMG's label. It contains songs from  Seasons 1-2, as well as all the songs from Tale of the Mighty Knights. There is a total of 22 tracks. This album was released in a cardboard foldout case, rather than a jewel case like the previous two releases. Borders carried the jewel case release exclusively, which included a booklet.

Tracks from 1 to 16
 "Ready for Anything"
 "We Love a Luau"
 "Tuba Polka"
 "I Feel Good"
 "Go, Go, Go!"
 "The Customer is Always Right"
 "Surf's Up, Ho Daddy"
 "Almost Everything is Boinga" (featuring Alicia Keys)
 "Nothing Too Tough"
 "W-I-O-Wa"
 "I'm a Mountie" (tune: "She'll Be Coming 'Round the Mountain")
 "Racing Day"
 "I Never Fail to Deliver the Mail"
 "Lady in Pink" (featuring Cyndi Lauper)
 "Nobody's Bigger Than a Giant"
 "Hurry Home"

Bonus Tracks from "Tale of the Mighty Knights"
 "A Challenge"
 "Dragon Mountain"
 "Goblin"
 "Not an Egg Anymore" (featuring Adam Pascal)
 "Tweedily-Dee"
 "We're Knights"

References

External links

 Page on NickJr.com (archive)
 

2000s American animated television series
2000s Canadian animated television series
2000s Nickelodeon original programming
2000s preschool education television series
2004 American television series debuts
2004 Canadian television series debuts
2010s American animated television series
2010s Canadian animated television series
2010s Nickelodeon original programming
2010s preschool education television series
2013 American television series endings
2013 Canadian television series endings
American children's animated adventure television series
American children's animated fantasy television series
American children's animated musical television series
American computer-animated television series
American preschool education television series
Animated television series about animals
Animated television series about children
Canadian children's animated adventure television series
Canadian children's animated fantasy television series
Canadian children's animated musical television series
Canadian computer-animated television series
Canadian preschool education television series
English-language television shows
Fictional quintets
Film and television memes
Nickelodeon original programming
Nick Jr. original programming
Treehouse TV original programming
Television series by Nelvana